Stjepan "Stipe" Andrijašević (born 7 February 1967) is a Croatian retired football player.

Club career
Andrijašević made his debut for local club Hajduk Split in 1983 and played in the 1994–95 UEFA Champions League knockout stage for them.

International career
He made his debut for Croatia in an October 1992 friendly match against Mexico and earned a total of 5 caps scoring no goals. His final international was an August 1994 friendly away against Israel.

Personal life
In September 1989 he was injured in road accident while riding his motorcycle which took him out of football for more than two years. He has two sons, Pjero (born 1988) and Franko (born 1991), and both of them are football players.

References

External links

 Profile - Croatian Football Association

1967 births
Living people
Footballers from Split, Croatia
Association football midfielders
Yugoslav footballers
Croatian footballers
Croatia international footballers
HNK Hajduk Split players
AS Monaco FC players
RC Celta de Vigo players
Rayo Vallecano players
Yugoslav First League players
Croatian Football League players
Ligue 1 players
La Liga players
Segunda División players
Croatian expatriate footballers
Expatriate footballers in Monaco
Croatian expatriate sportspeople in Monaco
Expatriate footballers in France
Croatian expatriate sportspeople in France
Expatriate footballers in Spain
Croatian expatriate sportspeople in Spain
HNK Hajduk Split non-playing staff